Kedron is an unincorporated community in Upshur County, West Virginia, United States.

The community derives its name from Kidron Valley in West Asia.

References 

Unincorporated communities in West Virginia
Unincorporated communities in Upshur County, West Virginia